Hadelin Viellevoye (22 November 1914 – 18 June 2010) was a Belgian footballer. He played in one match for the Belgium national football team in 1935.

References

External links
 

1914 births
2010 deaths
Belgian footballers
Belgium international footballers
Place of birth missing
Association football midfielders